The Hoh or Chalá·at ("Those-Who-Live-on-the-Hoh River" or "People of the Hoh River") are a Native American tribe in western Washington state in the United States. The tribe lives on the Pacific Coast of Washington on the Olympic Peninsula. The Hoh moved onto the Hoh Indian Reservation,  at the mouth of the Hoh River, on the Pacific Coast of Jefferson County, after the signing of the Quinault Treaty on July 1, 1855. It lies about halfway between its nearest outside communities of Forks, to its north, and Queets (on the Quinault Indian Reservation), to its south. The river is central to their culture. The main resources they used included cedar trees, salmon, and the nearby vegetation. They also traded and bartered with other tribes closer to Eastern Washington, near the Plateaus and Great Plains.

Name
The Hoh River (and the Hoh who were named after it) takes its name from the Quinault language name for the river, Hoxw. No meaning can be associated with the Quinault name, in fact, no etymology for the name can be found in either the Quinault or Quileute languages.

The Hoh call themselves Chalá·at or Chalat' (′People of the southern river, i.e. Hoh River′) after their name for the Hoh River Cha’lak’at’sit or Chalak'ac'it, which means the "southern river".

History
In aboriginal times, there was nothing secluded about the Hoh Watershed, even its upper reaches. No less than seven permanent settlements were situated along the banks of the Hoh, most with a fish trap. The river served not only as a riverine thoroughfare leading to their fishing sites and their hunting, trapping, and foraging grounds, it was also the nursery of the salmon and home of freshwater fishes that they harvested as part of their annual cycle. The watershed included the sites of the burials of their ancestors, the hidden locations of their empowering guardian spirits, and the family campgrounds and upstream summer-homesites near resource gathering areas that were heritable family property. Besides that, there were named landmarks, sites associated with ritual and mythic occurrences, and riverside trails.
The Hoh (Chalá·at) people refer to both their traditional lands and their reservation as  ChalAt’i’lo t’sikAti, (′the land belonging to the people who live at the Hoh River′).

Though the Hoh (Chalá·at) are today considered to be a band of the Quileute tribe, the original Hoh language was actually the Quinault language and they were related to the Quinault. After intermarriage with the Quileute, the Hoh became a bilingual tribe, speaking both Quileute and Quinault, until the Quileute language was favored. Today, however, all three tribes have overwhelmingly adopted American English as their home language.

The lifestyle of the Hoh, like many Northwest Coast tribes, involved the fishing of salmon.

Ethnobotany
The Hoh make use of Vaccinium myrtilloides. They eat the fruit raw, stew the berries and make them into a sauce, and can the berries and use them as winter food.

See also
Hoh Rainforest
Hoh River
Makah

References

Hoh Reservation, Washington United States Census Bureau

External links
Tribal website
Hoh tribe profile at the website of the Northwest Portland Area Indian Health Board
 University of Washington Libraries Digital Collections – The Pacific Northwest Olympic Peninsula Community Museum A web-based museum of the history and culture of Washington State's Olympic Peninsula communities

Native American tribes in Washington (state)
Federally recognized tribes in the United States
Indigenous peoples of the Northwest Plateau
Populated coastal places in Washington (state)